Ella Joyce (born Cherron Hoye; June 12, 1954) is an American actress. She is best known for her role as Eleanor Emerson on the Fox comedy-drama sitcom Roc, which originally ran from 1991 until 1994.

Early years 
The daughter of an autoworker and a hairdresser, Joyce was born Cherron Hoye in Chicago, Illinois, and raised in Detroit, Michigan. She graduated from the Performing Arts Curriculum at Cass Technical High School, and went on to attend the Dramatic Arts program at Eastern Michigan University. When financial problems caused her to leave, she returned to Detroit, where she graduated from a business school and then worked as an executive secretary at General Motors. She supplemented the income from that job by reading scripts for director Lloyd Richards, who encouraged her to act on-screen. After she moved to Harlem, New York City, she worked as a word processor while she improved her acting skills.

After she earned her first film credit in 1979, she changed her name to honor her mother and great-grandmother.

She has studied with several professional mentors, and worked in many regional theaters across America and overseas.

Career 
Joyce's career as an actress began on stage.

Her many theater credits include Fences (at the National Black Theater Festival), as well as Medea and the Doll, Steppin' into Tomorrow; she was the first to play the roles of Risa at the Yale world premiere production of Two Trains Running, Tonya in the world premiere production of King Hedley II, and Lily Ann Green in Crumbs from the Table of Joy, earning a Jefferson Award.

Other stage plays in which she has appeared include Bossa Nova, Last Street Play (The Mighty Gents), Checkmates, Brothers, Sisters, Husbands and Wives, Don't Get God Started!, Louis and Ophelia, Split Second, Home, Not a single Blade of Grass, Odessa, Barefoot in the Park, and Anna Lucasta.

Joyce's television credits include the pilot for NewsRadio, playing the part that eventually went to Khandi Alexander, and series regular "Eleanor Emerson" on Roc. She also played the recurring role of "Jasmine" on My Wife & Kids. She made a cameo appearance in the music video for TLC's "Waterfalls".

She has received numerous awards, nominations, and accolades for her performances in the theater, including the New York AUDELCO and the NAACP Image Nomination (for theater and television). She is also a recipient of the Spirit Of Detroit Award from the Mayor's Office in 1998.

Joyce has also had a role in the Tyler Perry film Temptation: Confessions of a Marriage Counselor. She played The Nurse in Don Coscarelli's 2003 film Bubba Ho-Tep, and Sister Watkins in Warner Bros.' Preacher's Kid. She appeared as Clifton's mother in Nina. She also had a role in the F. Gary Gray action film Set It Off.

Joyce is also a personal acting coach and consultant, and has worked with many high-profile artists, such as Toni Braxton. She has also written her first book Kink Phobia, Journey Through a Black Woman's Hair.

Joyce is also teaching fitness classes called Funkacize which she created and teaches to old school music using old school dance moves to get you moving and healthy.

Personal life 
Joyce married Dan Martin, an actor.

Filmography

Film

Television

References

External links 
 
 Kinkphobia
 Ms. Thing Productions, Inc.

Living people
Cass Technical High School alumni
Eastern Michigan University alumni
Actresses from Detroit
1954 births
American television actresses
African-American actresses
American film actresses
American stage actresses
21st-century African-American people
21st-century African-American women
20th-century African-American people
20th-century African-American women